Nambiar may refer to:

Nambiar (Ambalavasi caste), a Hindu caste in Kerala
Nambiar (Nair subcaste), an Indian caste from North Malabar

People
A. C. N. Nambiar (1896–1986), Indian nationalist and first Indian ambassador to Germany
Aneil Nambiar (born 1984), Indian cricketer
Ayillyath Kuttiari Gopalan Nambiar (1904–1977), known as AKG, Indian Communist leader
Balan Nambiar (born 1937), Indian artist, chairman of Lalit Kala Akademi
Bejoy Nambiar (born 1979), Indian writer, director, and producer
Lt Gen Chenicheri Satish Nambiar (born 1936), recipient of a Vir Chakra and Force Commander of UNPROFOR
Chenicheri Vijay K. Nambiar (born 1943), UN official, top aide to Secretary General Ban Ki-moon
Kalakkaththu Kunchan Nambiar (1705–1770), Malayali poet
K. Ananda Nambiar (1918–1991), Indian politician
Kannavath Sankaran Nambiar (1760–1801), prime minister of Pazhassi Raja
Mahima Nambiar, Indian actress who has appeared in Tamil and Malayalam films
M. N. Nambiar (1919–2008), Indian Tamil film actor
O. M. Nambiar (born 1932), Indian athletics coach
Parvathy Nambiar, South Indian actress and dancer known for her work in Malayalam Cinema
P. K. Venugopalan Nambiar (1924–1996), Indian agricultural scientist
Rahul Nambiar, Indian singer

Other uses
 Nambiyaar, a 2016 Tamil film

See also

Nambiyar River
Tamirabarani–Nambiar Link Canal